Henryk is a Polish male given name of Germanic origin. It means 'ruler of the home' or 'lord of the house'. It is pronounced similarly to Henrik, the spelling used in Sweden, Denmark, Norway, Estonia, Hungary and Slovenia.

The most common equivalents in other languages are Henry (English), Heikki (Finnish), Hendrik (Dutch), Heinrich (German), Enrico (Italian), Henri (French), Enrique (Spanish) and Henrique (Portuguese). A longer list can be found here.

People named Henryk

Kings, Princes and Nobility of Poland
 Henryk Mazowiecki (1368/1370–1392/1393), Polish noble and bishop 
 Henryk I Brodaty the Bearded (ca. 1165/70–1238), King of Poland
 Henryk I Jaworski (1292/96-1346)
 Henryk II Pobozny (1196/1207–1241)
 Henryk II Ziębicki (1396–1420)
 Henryk III Biały (1227/1230–1266)
 Henryk III Walezy (1551–1589)
 Henryk III głogowski (1251/60–1309))
 Henryk IV Probus (1258–1290)
 Henryk V Brzuchaty (1248–1296))
 Henryk IX of Lubin (1369–1419/1420))
 Henryk X of Chojnów ((1426–1452))

Art
 Henryk Chmielewski (comics) (1923–2021), Papcio Chmiel comic artist
 Henryk Gotlib (1890–1966), Polish-born painter, draughtsman, printmaker, and writer, who settled in England after World War II
 Henryk Siemiradzki (1843–1902), Polish painter
 Henryk Stażewski (1894–1988), Polish painter
 Henryk Tomaszewski (mime) (1919–2001), mime artist
 Henryk Tomaszewski (poster artist) (1914–2005), poster artist

Education
 Henryk Goldszmit, the real name of author, paediatrician, and child pedagogue Janusz Korczak
 Henryk Grossman (1881–1950), Polish-German economist and historian of Jewish descent 
 Henryk Lipszyc (born 1941), Polish specialist in Japanese culture and former ambassador to Japan

Literature
 Henryk Rzewuski (1791–1866), Polish Romantic-era journalist and novelist
 Henryk Samsonowicz (1930–2021), Polish historian specializing in medieval Poland, prolific writer, and professor of the University of Warsaw
 Henryk Sienkiewicz (1846–1916), Polish author Nobel Prize for Literature laureate 1905

Military
 Henryk Cybulski (1910–1971), Polish forester and resistance fighter
 Jan Henryk Dąbrowski (1755–1818), Polish general and national hero , one of the principal commanders of French Revolutionary Wars, Kościuszko Uprising, War of the Fourth Coalition and Battle of Trebbia (1799)
 Henryk Dembiński (1791–1864), Polish engineer, traveler and general
 Henryk Dobrzański (1897–1940), Polish soldier, sportsman and partisan
 Henryk Lederman (died 1944), cadet officer of the Polish Army, participant in the Warsaw Ghetto Uprising and the Warsaw Uprising
 Henryk Minkiewicz (1880–1940), Polish socialist politician and General of the Polish Army, murdered in the Katyń massacre
 Henryk Śniegocki (1893–1971), Scout and freedom fighter
 Henryk Sucharski (1898–1946), Polish military officer and a major in the Polish Army
 Henryk Woliński (1901–1986), member of the Polish resistance movement in World War II

Music
 Henryk Czyż (1923–2003), Polish musician, conductor and teacher
 Henryk Górecki (1933–2010), Polish composer
 Henryk Melcer-Szczawiński (1869–1928), Polish composer, pianist, conductor, and teacher
 Svika Pick (1949-2022), born Henryk Pick, Israeli pop singer, songwriter, composer, and television personality
 Henryk Szeryng (1918–1988), Polish-born violinist
 Henryk Wars (1902–1977), Polish and later an American neutralized citizen pop music composer
 Henryk Wieniawski (1835–1880), Polish composer

Politics
 Henryk Ehrlich (1882–1942), Polish activist
 Henryk Gołębiewski (born 1942), Polish politician
 Henryk Józewski (1892–1981), Polish visual artist, politician
 Henryk Milcarz (born 1950), Polish politician
 Henryk Sławik (1894–1944), Polish politician, diplomat, and social worker who during World War II helped save 5,000 Hungarian and Polish Jews from Budapest by giving them false Polish passports

Science
 Henryk Arctowski (1871–1958), Polish scientist, oceanographer and explorer of Antarctica
 Henryk Grabowski (1792–1842), German botanist and pharmacist of Polish heritage
 Henryk Iwaniec (born 1947), Polish American mathematician, professor
 Henryk Jordan (1842–1907), Polish philanthropist, physician and pioneer of physical education in Poland
 Henryk Niewodniczański (1900–1968), Polish physicist
 Henryk Zygalski (1908–1978), Polish mathematician and cryptologist who worked at breaking German Enigma ciphers before and during World War II

Sport
 Henryk Alszer (1918–1959), Polish footballer
 Henryk Apostel (born 1941), Polish international football player
 Henryk Bałuszyński (born 1972), Polish international football player
 Henryk Budzicz (born 1953), Polish sprint canoer
 Henryk Chmielewski (boxer) (1914–1998), Polish boxer who competed in the 1936 Summer Olympics
 Henryk Czapczyk (1922–2010), Warta Poznań football player
 Henryk Glücklich (1945–2014), former international motorcycle speedway rider
 Henryk Grabowski (athlete) (1929–2012), Polish long jumper
 Henryk Kasperczak (born 1946), Polish football manager and a football player
 Henryk Kukier (1930–2020), Polish boxer
 Henryk Leliwa-Roycewicz (1898–1990), Polish Olympic silver medallist in Eventing at 1936 Olympics
 Henryk Maculewicz (born 1950), retired Polish footballer
 Henryk Martyna (1907–1984), Polish international football player
 Henryk Miłoszewicz (1956–2003), Polish international football player
 Henryk Reyman (1897–1963), attacking soccer player, sports official and military officer
 Henryk Średnicki (1955–2016), Polish boxer
 Henryk Szordykowski (1944–2022), Polish middle distance runner

Other
 Henryk Abicht (1835–1863), Polish socialist and independence activist 
 Henryk Firlej (1574–1626), Polish noble, bishop
 Henryk Grohman (1862–1939), Polish industrialist of German origin
 Henryk Gulbinowicz (1972-), Cardinal Emeritus
 Henryk de Kwiatkowski (1924–2003), Polish-born member of the Royal Air Force
 Henryk Łowmiański (1898–1984), Polish medieval historian
 Henryk Muszyński (born 1933), Primate Emeritus of Poland and former Archbishop
 Henryk Pająk (born 1937), Polish writer, journalist and publisher
 Henryk Tomasik (born 1946), Bishop of Radom
 Henryk Zieliński (1920–1981), Polish historian and professor at the University of Wrocław

See also 

 Hendric
 Hendrick (disambiguation)
 Hendricks (disambiguation)
 Hendrickx
 Hendrik (disambiguation)
 Hendriks
 Hendrikx
 Hendrix (disambiguation)
 Hendryx
 Henrik
 Henry (disambiguation)

Masculine given names
Polish masculine given names